Arab Zahrat al-Dumayri was a Palestinian Arab village in the Haifa Subdistrict. It was depopulated during the 1947–1948 Civil War in Mandatory Palestine on April 10, 1948. It was located 40 km south of Haifa.

History
In the 1922 census of Palestine, conducted by the British Mandate authorities, Al Damaireh had a population of 227 Muslims. 

The population in  the 1945 statistics   was 620, all Muslims, with a total of 1,387   dunams of land  according to an official land and population survey.   Of this, Arabs used 263  dunams  for cereals, while a total of 512 dunams were non-cultivable land.

On 6 April 1948, the Haganah implemented a new policy for the coastal plains, namely of clearing the whole area of its Arab inhabitants. On 10 April the villagers of Arab Zahrat al-Dumayri, together with the villagers of Arab al-Fuqara and Arab al-Nufay'at, were ordered to leave the area.

References

Bibliography

External links
Welcome To 'Arab Zahrat al-Dumayri
'Arab Zahrat al-Dumayri, from Zochrot
Survey of Western Palestine, Map 7:   IAA, Wikimedia commons 
Arab Zahrat al-Dumayri from the Khalil Sakakini Cultural Center

Arab villages depopulated prior to the 1948 Arab–Israeli War
District of Haifa